An election to South Dublin County Council took place on 23 May 2014 as part of that year's Irish local elections. Forty councillors were elected from six local electoral areas by proportional representation with a single transferable vote for a five-year term of office.

Recognizing population growth, South Dublin County Council gained 14 seats since 2009. Sinn Féin emerged as the largest party after the local elections with 9 seats and 6 gains in total. The party won 2 seats in each of Clondalkin and the 2 Tallaght LEAs. Fine Gael retained second place but lost 1 seat overall to emerge with 7 seats. While the party won 2 seats in each of Clondalkin, Lucan and Rathfarnham she won no seat in either Tallaght LEA. Fianna Fáil gained 1 seat to win 5 seats overall, in the Lucan LEA, the first time they won a seat there since 2004, but were left without representation in Tallaght South. Labour were the big losers, losing 5 seats to emerge with 4 overall, and was left without representation in Lucan and Rathfarnham. Both People Before Profit and the Anti-Austerity Alliance secured 3 seats each. The Green Party also gained 1 seat in Rathfarnham. Independents were also among the biggest winners on the Council with 8 seats and 7 gains in total.

Results by party

Results by Electoral Area

Clondalkin

Lucan

Rathfarnham

Tallaght Central

Tallaght South

Templeogue-Terenure

References

Notes
Changes since Election

External links
 Official website

2014 Irish local elections
2014